Rachel Katherine DiPillo (born January 26, 1991) is an American actress. She is best known for her roles as Andie in The CW's comedy drama television series Jane the Virgin and as Dr. Sarah Reese in NBC's medical drama television series Chicago Med.

Early life
Rachel Katherine DiPillo was born on January 26, 1991, in Flint, Michigan. She grew up in Nashville, Tennessee.

Career
In 2015, DiPillo played Andie in the series Jane the Virgin.

She starred in NBC's comedy pilot Cuckoo based on the British sitcom of the same name with Michael Chiklis and Cheryl Hines in spring 2015, but the network ultimately passed on the project.

DiPillo played Sarah Reese in Chicago Med, which premiered on November 17, 2015. She made appearances with the character throughout Chicago PD and Chicago Fire.

Filmography

Film

Television and web series

References

External links
 

1991 births
21st-century American actresses
Actresses from Tennessee
American film actresses
American television actresses
Living people
Actors from Flint, Michigan
People from Nashville, Tennessee